Sir Ian McTaggart Sinclair,  (14 January 1926 – 8 July 2013) was a British international lawyer and diplomat.

Born in Glasgow, Sinclair was educated at the Glasgow Academy, Merchiston Castle School, and King's College, Cambridge, where he read law. He joined the Foreign Office as an assistant legal adviser in 1950. In 1976, he was appointed Legal Adviser to the Foreign and Commonwealth Office, serving until 1984, when he retired early. After his retirement, Sinclair returned to the bar.

References

1926 births
2013 deaths
British barristers
British King's Counsel
Intelligence Corps soldiers
People educated at the Glasgow Academy
People educated at Merchiston Castle School
Alumni of King's College, Cambridge
British diplomats
Members of the Middle Temple
Members of the Institut de Droit International
Knights Commander of the Order of St Michael and St George
20th-century King's Counsel
21st-century King's Counsel
Members of the International Law Commission